Events in the year 1899 in music.

Specific locations
1899 in Norwegian music

Events 
January 25 – Adelina Patti marries her third husband, Baron Rolf Cederström.
March 3 – Richard Strauss conducts the premiere of Ein Heldenleben with the Frankfurter Opern- und Museumsorchester.
April 26
Jean Sibelius conducts the world première of his Symphony No. 1 in Helsinki.
Tenor Antonio Paoli makes his début in Rossini's William Tell in Paris.
May 27 – Maurice Ravel conducts the first performance of his song cycle Shéhérazade.
June 19 – Edward Elgar's Enigma Variations (Variations on an Original Theme, Op. 36) are premiered at St James's Hall in London conducted by Hans Richter. A revised version is first heard on September 13 at the Three Choirs Festival in Worcester Cathedral with Elgar conducting.
September 18 – Scott Joplin's Maple Leaf Rag is registered for copyright as ragtime music enjoys mainstream popularity in the United States.
October 19 – Claude Debussy marries Rosalie Texier, having lived for nine years with her best friend; the marriage lasts only five years.
December 30 – Samuel Coleridge-Taylor marries Jessie Walmisley.
date unknown
Charles Hale's song "At a Darktown Cakewalk" includes an early appearance of the riff "Shave and a Haircut".
Billy Murray makes his singing debut.

Published popular music

 "Absent"     w. Catherine Young Glen m. John W. Metcalf
 "Always!"     w. Charles Horwitz m. Frederick V. Bowers
 "Cake Walk in The Sky" by Ben Harney
 "Come Home Dewey We Won't Do a Thing to You"     w.m. Paul Dresser
 "A Coon Band Contest"     m. Arthur Pryor
 "Cotton Pickers Rag & Cakewalk" by William Braun
 "Doan Ye Cry, Mah Honey"     w.m. Alfred W. Noll
 "Hands Across the Sea"     m. John Philip Sousa
 "Hearts and Flowers"     w. Mary D. Brine m. Theodore Moses Tobani
 "Hello! Ma Baby"     w.m. Ida Emerson & Joseph E. Howard
 "I'd Leave My Happy Home for You"     w. Will A. Heelan m. Harry Von Tilzer
 "If Only You Were Mine"     w. Harry B. Smith m. Victor Herbert
 "I'll Be Your Sweetheart" w.m. Harry Dacre
 "Impecunious Davis" by Kerry Mills
 "Keep on the Sunny Side", w. A. Blenkhorn, m. J.H. Entwisle
 "Mandy Lee" w.m. Thurland Chattaway
 "Maple Leaf Rag" by Scott Joplin
 "Mosquito Parade"     m. Howard Whitney
 "My Little Georgia Rose"     w. Robert F. Roden m. Max S. Witt
 "My Wild Irish Rose"     w.m. Chauncey Olcott
 "'O Sole Mio!"     w. Giovanni Capurro m. Eduardo di Capua
 "A Picture No Artist Can Paint"     w.m. J. Fred Helf
 "She Was Happy Till She Met You"     w. Charles Graham m. Monroe H. Rosenfeld
 "Smoky Mokes"     m. Abe Holzmann
 "Stay in Your Own Back Yard"     w. Karl Kennett m. Lyn Udall
 "The Story of the Rose" (aka "Heart Of My Heart")      w. "Alice" m. Andrew Mack
 "Telephone Me, Baby" w.m. George M. Cohan
 "There's Where My Heart Is Tonight"     w.m. Paul Dresser
 "When most I wink" m. Frank Bridge
 "Where the Sweet Magnolias Grow"     w. Andrew B. Sterling m. Harry Von Tilzer
 "Whistling Rufus"     w. W. Murdock Lind m. Kerry Mills
 "You Tell Me Your Dream, I'll Tell You Mine" w. Seymore Rice & Albert H. Brown, m. Charles N. Daniels

Recorded popular music

 "Abide With Me" (w. Rev Henry Francis Lyte m. William Henry Monk)  – Frank C. Stanley on Edison Records
 "Always!" (w. Charles Horwitz m. Frederick V. Bowers)  – May Kelso on Edison Records – Harry Macdonough on Edison Records
 "Asleep In The Deep" (w. Arthur J. Lamb m. Henry W. Petrie)  – William Hooley on Edison Records
 "At A Georgia Camp Meeting" (w.m. Kerry Mills)  – John Terrell on Berliner Records – Dan W. Quinn on Edison Records – banjo Vess L. Ossman on Columbia Records
 "Ave Maria" (w. (Fr) Paul Bernard m. Charles Gounod)  – M. A. Guarini on Edison Records – W. D. McFarland on Berliner Records
 "Because" (w. Charles Horwitz m. Frederick V. Bowers)  – Albert C. Campbell on Edison Records – Sousa's Band on Berliner Records
 "Believe Me, if All Those Endearing Young Charms" (w. Thomas Moore m. trad)  – J. J. Fisher on Edison Records
 "The Boy Guessed Right" (w.m. Lionel Monckton)  – Albert C. Campbell on Edison Records & Berliner Records
 "The Cake Walk" (trad US)  – Eugene Stratton with piano Leslie Stuart on Berliner Gramophone
 "Calvary" (w. Henry Vaughan m. Paul Rodney)  – Albert C. Campbell on Berliner Records
 "Comin' Thro' The Rye" (w. Robert Burns m. trad)  – Syria Lamonte with piano Fred Gaisberg on Berliner Gramophone
"Curse of the Dreamer"  – Dan W. Quinn on Columbia Records
 "Down The Road" (w.m. Fred Gilbert)  – Gus Elen on Berliner Gramophone
 "Eli Green's Cakewalk" (w.m. David Reed & Sadie Koninsky)  – banjo Vess L. Ossman on Edison Records
 "Emmet's Lullaby" (w.m. J. K. Emmet)  – George P. Watson on Edison Records
 "Funiculi-Funicula" (w. G. Turco m. Luigi Denza)  – Hotel Cecil Orchestra on Berliner Gramophone
 "The Future Mrs 'Awkins" (w.m. Albert Chevalier)  – Albert Chevalier on Berliner Gramophone
 "God Save The Queen" – Frank C. Stanley on Edison Records – Sousa's Band on Berliner Records
 "Gypsy Love Song" (w. Harry B. Smith m. Victor Herbert)  – Eugene Cowles on Berliner Records – William Hooley on Edison Records
 "Hands Across The Sea March" (m. John Philip Sousa)  – Peerless Orchestra on Edison Records – Sousa's Band on Berliner Records
 "Hearts And Flowers" (w. Mary D. Brine m. Theodore Moses Tobani)  – violin Chris De Arth on Berliner Records
 "Hello! Ma Baby" (w.m. Ida Emerson & Joseph E. Howard)  – Arthur Collins on Edison Records – Len Spencer on Berliner Records & Columbia Records
 "The Holy City" (w. Frederick Edward Weatherly m. Stephen Adams)  – Harry Macdonough on Edison Records
 "Home Sweet Home" (w. John Howard Payne m. Sir Henry Rowley Bishop)  – whistling John Yorke Atlee on Berliner Records
 "I Dreamt I Dwelt In Marble Halls" (w. Alfred Bunn m. Michael William Balfe)  – J. W. Myers on Berliner Records
 "I Guess I'll Have To Telegraph My Baby" (w.m. George M. Cohan)  – Arthur Collins on Edison Records – Edward M. Favor on Berliner Records – George J. Gaskin on Columbia Records
 "I'd Leave My Happy Home For You" (w. Will A. Heelan m. Harry Von Tilzer)  – Arthur Collins on Edison Records
 "If It Wasn't For The 'Ouses In Between" (w. Edgar Bateman m. George Le Brunn)  – Gus Elen on Berliner Gramophone
 "If Only You Were Mine" (w. Harry B. Smith m. Victor Herbert)  – Albert C. Campbell on Edison Records
 "It's A Great Big Shame" (w. Edgar Bateman m. George Le Brunn)  – Gus Elen on Berliner Gramophone
 "Jack's The Boy" (Greenbank, Jones)  – H. Scott Russell with p. Fred Gaisberg on Berliner Gramophone
 "Just As The Sun Went Down" (w. Karl Kennett m. Lyn Udall)  – J. W. Myers on Berliner Records – S. H. Dudley & Harry Macdonough on Edison Records
 "Just One Girl" (w. Karl Kennett m. Lyn Udall)  – Sousa's Band on Berliner Records – Albert C. Campbell on Edison Records – H. Scott Russell with p. Amy Williams on Berliner Gramophone – J. W. Myers on Columbia Records
 "Kathleen Mavourneen" (w. Annie Crawford (Barry) m. Frederick William Nichols Crouch)  – William F. Hooley on Edison Records
 "Kiss Me, Honey Do" (w. Edgar Smith m. John Stromberg)  – Albert C. Campbell on Berliner Records – Len Spencer on Berliner Records & Columbia Records – Arthur Collins on Edison Records
 "Little Dolly Daydream" (w.m. Leslie Stuart)  – Eugene Stratton on Berliner Gramophone
"Little Old New York is Good Enough For Me"  – Dan W. Quinn on Berliner Records
 "The Lost Chord" (w. Adelaide Anne Procter m. Sir Arthur Sullivan)  – William F. Hooley on Berliner Records
 "Mandy Lee" (w.m. Thurland Chattaway)  – Albert C. Campbell on Edison Records – Arthur Collins on Edison Records
 "'Mid The Green Fields Of Virginia" (w.m. Charles K. Harris)  – Albert C. Campbell on Berliner Records – S. H. Dudley & Harry Macdonough on Edison Records – George J. Gaskin on Columbia Records
 "Mister Johnson, Turn Me Loose" (w.m. Ben Harney)  – John Terrell on Berliner Records
 "Molly's The Girl For Me" – J. Aldrich Libbey on Columbia Records
 "The Moth And The Flame" (w. George Taggart m. Max S. Witt)  – Albert C. Campbell on Edison Records – J. J. Fisher on Edison Records
 "My Little Georgia Rose" (w. Robert F. Roden m. Max S. Witt)  – Jere Mahoney on Edison Records
 "My Old Dutch" (w. Albert Chevalier m. Charles Ingle)  – Albert Chevalier on Berliner Gramophone
 "My Old New Hampshire Home" (w. Andrew B. Sterling m. Harry Von Tilzer)  – Jere Mahoney on Edison Records – Byron G. Harlan & A. D. Madeira on Edison Records – Albert C. Campbell on Berliner Records – George J. Gaskin on Berliner Records – The Greater New York Quartette on Columbia Records
 "My Wild Irish Rose" (w.m. Chauncey Olcott)  – Albert C. Campbell on Edison Records
 "Night Hymn At Sea" – Clara Butt & Kennerley Rumford on Berliner Gramophone
 "The Old Brigade" (w. Fred E. Weatherly m. Orlando Barri)  – H. Scott Russell with piano Fred Gaisberg on Berliner Gramophone
 "Old Man's Story" – J. Aldrich Libbey on Columbia records
 "The Old Oaken Bucket" (w. Samuel Woodworth m. E. Kaillmark)  – Haydn Quartette on Berliner Records
 "The Organ Grinder's Serenade"  – J. Aldrich Libbey on Columbia Records
 "A Picture No Artist Can Paint" (w.m. J. Fred Helf)  – Albert C. Campbell on Edison Records – George J. Gaskin on Columbia Records
 "She Is The Belle Of New York" (w. Hugh Morton m. Gustave Kerker)  – Frank Lawton with p. Fred Gaisberg on Berliner Gramophone
 "She Was Bred In Old Kentucky" (w. Harry Braisted m. Stanley Carter)  – Albert C. Campbell on Berliner Records – George J. Gaskin on Columbia Records
 "She Was Happy Till She Met You" (w. Charles Graham m. Monroe H. Rosenfeld)  – Jere Mahoney on Edison Records – Dan W. Quinn on Columbia Records
 "Smoky Mokes" (m. Abe Holzmann)  – Len Spencer on Columbia Records – Dan W. Quinn on Edison Records – Vess L. Ossman on Columbia Records
 "The Soldiers Of The Queen" (w.m. Leslie Stuart)  – Albert Christian with p. Leslie Stuart on Berliner Gramophone
 "Sweet Rosie O'Grady" (w.m. Maude Nugent)  – Lil Hawthorne on Berliner Gramophone
 "Take A Pair Of Sparkling Eyes" (w. William S. Gilbert m. Arthur Sullivan)  – Herbert Scott Russell with p. Fred Gaisberg on Berliner Gramophone
 "'Tis The Last Rose Of Summer" (w. Thomas Moore m. Richard Alfred Milliken)  – J. W. Myers on Berliner Records
 "Toreador Song" (w. H. Meilac, Ludovic Halévy m. Georges Bizet)  – Montague Borwell on Berliner Gramophone
 "Whistling Rufus" (w. W. Murdock Lind m. Kerry Mills)  – Len Spencer on Berliner Records – Sousa's Band on Berliner Records – banjo Vess L. Ossman on Columbia Records & Berliner Records – Dan W. Quinn on Edison Records
 "Yes, Let Me Like A Soldier Fall" (w. Edward Fitzball m. Vincent Wallace)  – Ferruccio Giannini on Berliner Records
 "You've Been A Good Old Wagon" (Harney)  – Len Spencer on Columbia Records & Berliner Records

Classical music 
Hugo Alfvén – Symphony No. 2 in D
Tor Aulin – 4 Aquarellen for Violin and Piano, Op. 12 or 15
Amy Beach – Piano Concerto in C minor, Op. 45 (198/9)
Joseph Callaerts – Toccata, Op.29
Frederick Delius – Paris, Nocturne
Friedrich Diethe – Romanze for Bass Clarinet
Ernő von Dohnányi – Sonata for Cello and Piano in B minor
Edward Elgar 
Variations on an Original Theme (Enigma), Op. 36
Dry Those Fair, Those Crystal Eyes
Sérénade lyrique, for orchestra
George Enescu – Violin Sonata No. 2 in F minor, Op. 6
Axel Gade – Concerto No. 2 for violin and orchestra in F major
Louis Glass – Symphony No. 2 in C minor
Reinhold Glière – Symphony No. 1
Leopold Godowsky – 3 Concert Studies, Op.11
Theodore Gouvy – Paraphrases symphoniques, Op.89
Edvard Grieg – Ave maris stella, EG 150
Johan Halvorsen – Norwegian Festival Overture
Siegmund von Hausegger – Barbarossa
Hans Huber – Concerto No. 3 for piano and orchestra
Scott Joplin – Maple Leaf Rag
Ferdinand Kühne – Geburstags-Marsch, Op.41
Max Laurischkus 
Elegie, Op.2
Duos, Op.3
Luise Adolpha Le Beau – Elegy, Op.44
Ernst Mielck – Finnish Suite, Op. 10
Ethelbert Nevin – En Passant, Op.30
Maurice Ravel – Pavane pour une Infante défunte, for piano
Vladimir Rebikov 
3 Morceaux, Op.7
Suite de ballet, Op.14
Jean Sibelius – Symphony No. 1 in E minor
Josef Suk – Symphony No. 1 in E major
Arnold Schoenberg – Verklärte Nacht

Opera
Eugen d'Albert – Kain
Antonín Dvořák – The Devil and Kate
Josef Bohuslav Foerster – Eva
Victor Herbert – The Ameer, premiered October 10 in Scranton
Isidore de Lara – Messaline
Jules Massenet – Cendrillon (composed 1894–5, premiered 1899)
Nicolai Rimsky-Korsakov – The Tsar's Bride, (premiered November 3 in Moscow)
Max von Schillings – Der Pfeifertag, Op.10 (premiered February 26 in Schwerin)

Musical theater

 Die Landstreicher – Karl Michael Ziehrer
 El Capitan     London production
 Florodora (Music: Leslie Stuart Lyrics: Sidney Jones & Paul Rubens Book: Owen Hall)     London production opened at the Lyric Theatre on November 11
 A Gaiety Girl London revival opened at Daly's Theatre on June 5
 Helter-Skelter     Broadway production
 The Rogers Brothers In Wall Street     Broadway production
The Rose of Persia (music by Sir Arthur Sullivan, libretto by Basil Hood) London production opened at the Savoy Theatre on November 29
 San Toy     London production opened at Daly's Theatre on October 21

Births 
January 7
Al Bowlly, singer (died 1941)
Francis Poulenc, composer (died 1963)
January 14 – Herbert Sumsion, composer and organist (died 1995)
January 21 – Alexander Tcherepnin, pianist and composer (died 1977)
February 15 – Georges Auric, composer (died 1983)
February 21 – Clara Clairbert, operatic soprano (died 1970)
March 5 – Patrick Hadley, composer (died 1973)
March 10 – Finn Høffding, composer (died 1997)
March 13 – Pancho Vladigerov, composer (died 1978)
March 26 – William Baines, English composer and pianist (died 1922)
April 5 
Leonard Falcone, baritone/euphonium virtuoso and director of bands at Michigan State (died 1985)
Bernhard Kaun, American Hollywood filmscore composer (died 1980)
April 7 – Robert Casadesus, French pianist and composer (died 1972)
April 29 – Duke Ellington, jazz musician and composer (died 1974)
May 1 – Jón Leifs, composer (died 1968)
May 6 – Billy Cotton, bandleader (died 1969)
May 10 – Fred Astaire, song-and-dance man (died 1987)
May 30 – Jack Little, singer and songwriter (died 1956)
June 1 – Werner Janssen, conductor and composer (died 1990)
June 9 – Signe Amundsen, operatic soprano (died 1987)
June 11 – George Frederick McKay, composer (died 1970)
June 13 – Carlos Chávez, composer and conductor
June 16 – Helen Traubel, opera singer (died 1972)
June 19 – Pat Ballard, songwriter (died 1960)
June 21 – Pavel Haas, composer (killed 1944)
June 30 – Harry Shields, jazz musician (died 1971)
July 1 – Thomas A. Dorsey, "father of gospel music" (died 1993)
July 3 – Benny Nawahi, ukulele player (died 1985)
July 10 – André Souris, composer and writer (died 1970)
July 17 – James Cagney, US actor, singer and dancer (died 1986)
July 30 – John Woods Duke, composer (died 1984)
August 6 – Margarete Klose, operatic mezzo-soprano (died 1968)
August 12 – Leila Fletcher, pianist and composer (died 1988)
September 6 – Billy Rose, Broadway producer and lyricist (died 1966)
September 9 – Maria Yudina, pianist (died 1970)
September 11 – Jimmie Davis, country and gospel singer-songwriter and politician (died 2000)
September 13 – Ephraim Amu, composer, musicologist and music teacher (died 1995)
September 25 – Ricard Lamote de Grignon, conductor and composer (died 1965)
September 26 – William L. Dawson, composer (died 1990)
October 9 – Mary Jarred, opera singer (died 1993)
October 19 – Sidonie Goossens, harpist (died 2004)
October 31 – Ted Shapiro, songwriter and pianist (died 1980)
November 9 – Mezz Mezzrow, jazz musician (died 1972)
November 17 – Toscha Seidel, violinist (died 1962)
November 18 – Eugene Ormandy, violinist and conductor (died 1985)
November 22 – Hoagy Carmichael, composer, pianist and singer (died 1981)
November 29 – Gustave Reese, musicologist (died 1977)
November 30 – Hans Krása, Czech-German composer (killed 1944)
December 2 – Sir John Barbirolli, conductor (died 1970)
December 11 – Julio de Caro, composer (died 1980)
December 16 – Noël Coward, dramatist, actor, singer and composer (died 1973)
December 18 – Muriel Brunskill, operatic contralto (died 1980)
December 21 – Silvestre Revueltas, composer (died 1940)
date unknown – Sadettin Heper, composer (died 1980)

Deaths 
January 10 – Albert Becker, composer, 64
February 3 – Amalie Joachim, contralto and voice teacher (born 1839)
February 4 – Eduard Holst, Danish composer, playwright, actor, dancer and dance master, 52
April 17 – Hans Balatka, composer, 72
April 23 – Lucien Delormel, lyricist (born 1847)
May 21 – Louise Tunison, composer and organist, 26
May 29 – Frantz Jehin-Prume, violinist, composer, and music educator, 60
June 3 – Johann Strauss II, composer, 73
June 10 – Ernest Chausson, composer, 44 (bicycle accident)
June 16 – August Winding, composer, 64
August 17 – Erik Bøgh, journalist, dramatist and songwriter, 77
August 28 – Guillermo Morphy, musicologist, 63
October 10 – Allan James Foley, operatic bass, 62
October 11 – John Troutbeck, musicologist (b. 1832)
October 13 – Aristide Cavaillé-Coll, organ-builder, 88
October 15 – Johann Nepomuk Fuchs, conductor and composer, 57
October 18 – Gussie Davis, songwriter, 36
October 22 – Ernst Mielck, composer, 21 (tuberculosis)
October 23 – Ludwig Straus, violinist, 64
October 31 – Hugh Talbot, singer and actor, 54
November 16 – Vincas Kudirka, lyricist of the Lithuanian national anthem, 40 (tuberculosis)
November 25 – Robert Lowry, hymn writer, 73
December 7 – Anton de Kontski, pianist and composer, 82
December 10 – Hans von Milde, operatic baritone, 78
December 20 – Romain Bussine, poet, baritone, and voice teacher, 69
December 21
Joseph Dupont, violinist, theatre director and conductor, 61
Charles Lamoureux, conductor and violinist, 65
December 23 – Marietta Piccolomini, operatic soprano, 65
December 31 – Carl Millöcker, conductor and composer, 57

References

 
1890s in music
19th century in music
Music by year